My Blue Heaven or  Mijn Blauwen Hemel  is a 1990 Dutch drama film directed by Ronald Beer.

Cast
Ruud de Wolff	... 	Paatje
Ivon Pelasula	... 	Brenda Benoit
Koen Wauters	... 	Hans van de Broeck
Bo Bojoh	... 	Maatje
Leen Jongewaard	... 	Vader van de Broeck
Michel Sorbach	... 	Boetie
Angélique Corneille	... 	Bella
Remco Djojosepoetro	... 	Hannies
Victor Reinier	... 	Mickey
Con Meyer	... 	Meyer
Edda Barends	... 	Mw. Van de Broeck
Bert Luppes	... 	Leen
Tatjana Simic	... 	Suzy
Julius Wendrich	... 	Ko
Carola Gijsbers van Wijk	... 	Mrs. Koopmans

External links 
 

1990 films
1990s Dutch-language films
1990 drama films
Dutch drama films
nl:Mijn Blauwen Hemel